HMS Varbel was a Royal Navy shore establishment during World War II, used as a base for Operation Source. It was in the luxury 88-bedroomed Kyles Hydro Hotel at Port Bannatyne on the Isle of Bute in the Firth of Clyde off the west coast of Scotland.

The hotel was demolished in the 1970s. The houses along the waterfront are still there. The pier has gone except some old decaying piles.

References

External links
Description and history of the hotel
Image of the hotel
Google Earth ground view into Pier Lane inland from the site of the white building at the head of the pier in the previous image
Google Earth air view: the site of the hotel
Bute at War Port Bannatyne's role during World War II as the home of the shore based "HMS Varbel" which served as the HQ for the 12th Submarine Flotilla (Midget or X-Craft Submarines).

Royal Navy shore establishments